Maxime Médard (born 16 November 1986) is a former French rugby union player who plays his club rugby for French club Stade Toulousain in Top 14 and France internationally. He can play as both a full-back and on the wing and is described by assistant national team coach Émile Ntamack as an "incredible talent" that, during the 2010–11 season, was finally "realizing his potential". Medard is a two-time winner of the Heineken Cup and, in 2008, won the Top 14 for the first time. Also referred to as 'The French Wolverine.'

Career

Club 
Médard began his rugby union career playing for local club Blagnac as a youth. His father, Alain, had previously played for the club in the 1980s alongside his uncle Francis. In 2000, he joined Stade Toulousain and spent four years developing. Médard achieved numerous honours as a youth winning the Gaudermen Challenge in three straight years from 2001–2003. In 2004, he made his debut with the senior team and, in the following year, turned professional. In his first year as a professional, Médard was a member of the Toulousain team that won the 2004–05 Heineken Cup. Toulouse defeated league rivals Stade Français 18–12 in the final match, though Médard was not part of the team that won the final. Médard burst onto the scene domestically in the 2007–08 season primarily due to injuries to Vincent Clerc and Clément Poitrenaud. He featured regularly in the team that won the Top 14 that season. For his efforts, he was declared the Revelation of the Year by Ligue Nationale de Rugby (LNR). He started the 2010 Heineken Cup Final as Toulouse defeated Biarritz. On 5 September 2010, Médard scored the fastest try in league history since 2005 after scoring after 18 seconds against La Rochelle.

International 
Prior to playing for the senior team, Médard was a regular international at youth level. In 2005, he was a member of the under-21 team that played at the 2005 Under 21 Rugby World Championship in Argentina. In the ensuing season, Médard won the 2006 edition of the competition that was played on home soil. He earned his first senior cap France in November 2008 during a test series match against Argentina. He appeared in subsequent test matches against the Pacific Islanders and the All Blacks. Médard's positive play within the team resulted in the player earning selection to the team that participated in the 2009 Six Nations Championship. In June 2009, Médard scored the late try that sealed France's first victory over the All Blacks in New Zealand since 1994.

Médard announced his retirement from rugby in 2022.

International Tries

Honours

Club 
 Stade Toulousain
Top 14: 2007–08, 2010–11, 2011–12, 2018–19, 2020–21
Heineken Cup: 2005, 2010, 2021

International 
 France
Under 21 Rugby World Championship: 2006

References

External links 
 Stade Toulousain profile page
 ERC Rugby Profile

1986 births
Living people
French rugby union players
H
Rugby union wings
Rugby union fullbacks
France international rugby union players
Rugby union players from Toulouse